Beydili is a small  village in Gülnar district of  Mersin Province, Turkey. At  it is situated in the mountainous area to the south of Gülnar. The population of Beydili was 73 as of 2012.

References

Villages in Gülnar District